Lakshmi Niwas Birla (11 July 1909 - 29 August 1994) was one of the scions of Birla family and a noted Industrialist , philanthropist , writer and art connoisseur.  

He was the eldest son of Ghanshyam Das Birla and his first wife Durgadevi. He was later adopted by Jugal Kishore Birla. He later married to Sushila Devi and had one son Sudarshan Kumar Birla from marriage born in 1934. 

He served as president of Indian Chamber of Commerce in 1951 and the Federation of Indian Chambers of Commerce & Industry for year 1967.

He wrote many books in English and Hindi and was also noted art connoisseur.

He donated monies to build Hindu temples. The idols of Hindu temple at Durban had been bought out of his donations.

References

1909 births
1994 deaths
Birla family
Hindi-language writers
Indian industrialists
Indian philanthropists
Businesspeople from London